Brevipogon is a genus of soft-bodied plant beetles in the family Artematopodidae. There is one described species in Brevipogon, B. confusus.

References

Further reading

 
 

Elateroidea genera
Articles created by Qbugbot